Poems for Piano: The Piano Music of Marion Brown is the debut album by American pianist Amina Claudine Myers featuring performances recorded in 1979 for the Sweet Earth label.

Reception
The Allmusic review by Brian Olewnick awarded the album 4 stars, stating: "Poems for Piano is a superb recording, offering abundant evidence of both Marion Brown's deep and sensitive compositional gifts and Amina Claudine Myers' all-too-unrecognized strengths as a player and interpreter. Highly recommended".

Track listing
All compositions by Marion Brown except as indicated
 "Sweet Earth Flying" - 10:00 
 "November Cotton Flower" - 9:08 
 "Evening Song" - 7:57 
 "Sunday Comedown" - 9:18 
 "Golden Lady in the Graham Cracker Window" - 5:00 
 "Sienna Maimoun" - 4:00 
 "Going Home" (Amina Claudine Myers) - 6:08
Recorded at Vanguard Studios in New York City on July 26, 1979

Personnel
Amina Claudine Myers - piano

References

Amina Claudine Myers albums
Solo piano jazz albums
1979 albums